Franzen or Franzén is a Scandinavian surname. Notable people with the surname include:

Anders Franzén (1918–1993), Swedish underwater archaeologist
Arno Franzen, Brazilian rower
Arvid Franzen (1899–1961), Swedish-American accordionist and bandleader
Carin Franzén (born 1962), Swedish literary scholar
Christian Franzen (photographer) (1864–1923), Danish photographer and diplomat based in Spain
Christian Franzen (businessman) (1845–1920), American politician, farmer, and businessman
Christoffer Franzén (born 1988), Swedish musician known as Lights & Motion
Cola Franzen (1923–2018), American writer and translator
Ellinor Franzén (born 1978), Swedish singer
Frans Michael Franzén (1772–1847), Swedish poet
Gustaf Franzen (born 1996), Swedish ice hockey player
Ingemar Franzén (1927–1985), Swedish weightlifter
Ivar Franzén (1932–2004), Swedish politician
Jens Franzen (1937–2018), German paleontologist
Johan Franzén (born 1979), Swedish professional ice hockey player
Johan Franzén (politician) (1879–1946), Finnish farmer, bank director and politician
John-Erik Franzén (born 1942), Swedish artist
Jonathan Franzen (born 1959), American novelist and essayist
Julia Franzén (born 1990), Swedish television personality, personal trainer and life coach
Katja Franzen (born 1990), German speed skater
Lauro Franzen (1911–1971), Brazilian rower
Malene Franzen (born 1970), Danish rhythmic gymnast
Mathias Franzén, Swedish handball player
Mathias Franzén (ice hockey) (born 1992), Swedish ice hockey player
Matt Franzen, American football coach
Melisa Franzen (born 1980), American politician
Mia Franzén (born 1971), Swedish politician
Michelle Franzen (born 1968), American correspondent for ABC News Radio
Nell Franzen (1889–1973), American actress
Nilo Franzen, Brazilian rower
Nils Franzén (1910–1985), Swedish politician
Nils-Olof Franzén (1916–1997), Swedish author
Peter Franzén (born 1971), Finnish actor
Peter Franzen, English journalist
Rikard Franzén (born 1968), Swedish professional ice hockey player
Roger Franzén (born 1964), Swedish football manager and former player
Sixten Franzén (1919–2008), Swedish scientist
Torkel Franzén (1950–2006), Swedish academic
Ulrich Franzen (1921–2012), German-American architect

Places
Franzen, Wisconsin, town in the United States

See also 
 Frantzen (disambiguation)
 Franz (disambiguation)